Randolph Foster (born 14 August 1968) is a Costa Rican sprinter. He competed in the men's 200 metres at the 1992 Summer Olympics.

References

1968 births
Living people
Athletes (track and field) at the 1992 Summer Olympics
Costa Rican male sprinters
Olympic athletes of Costa Rica
Place of birth missing (living people)
Central American Games gold medalists for Costa Rica
Central American Games medalists in athletics
Central American Games silver medalists for Costa Rica
20th-century Costa Rican people